The Aigle–Ollon–Monthey–Champéry railway line is a metre-gauge railway line in the Chablais region of Switzerland. It was originally built by the Chemin de fer Aigle–Ollon–Monthey (AOM) in 1907–1908. Ownership passed to the Chemin de fer Aigle-Ollon-Monthey-Champéry (AOMC) in 1946. Today, it is part of the Transports Publics du Chablais.

History 

The original intention had been to construct a railway from Aigle to Villars via Ollon and the concession was awarded on 27 April 1897. The Chemin de fer Bex-Gryon-Villars, however, strongly objected to the new line, arguing that there was insufficient traffic for two lines to serve Villars. After listening to the arguments, the federal authorities agreed and the original concession was withdrawn to be replaced by a new one for a line from Aigle to Monthey via Ollon. Concession to build the line was awarded on 6 February 1899 and was followed by that for a line from Monthey to Champéry on 22 June of the same year. The latter would be built by the Chemin de fer Monthey-Champéry-Morgins (MCM).

The AOM opened to traffic on 3 April 1907. Construction of the line to Champéry was slower and this was not ready for traffic by the time of the opening of the AOM, but took place on 30 January 1908. The plans for a line from the village of Val d'Illiez to Morgins were scrapped following poor profit forecasts.

From 1 January 1946 the two companies amalgamated to form the AOMC and plans were put forward to bring the line up to date. With regard to the rolling stock for the line, this meant the construction of four new railcars of Series BDeh4/4, numbered 511–4, which were delivered in 1954.

Passenger rolling stock has been regularly updated since that time, with the latest delivery, two twin-car railcars (numbered 591 and 592), arriving in 2001.

Although the line to Morgins was not built, the present day system does include a short, one kilometre section from the town station in Champéry to Champéry-Planachaux, where a lift forms part of the public access to the mountains.

Nowadays the AOMC is part of a larger, regional system operated, along with local bus services, by the Transports Publics du Chablais.

The line 
It is electrically operated by overhead contact at 850 V DC.

Important investment plans were developed by the AOMC in 1995. One plan involved the construction of a large maintenance workshop and stockholding facility. This work was completed and opened by the TPC in 2001. The new dépôt at En Châlex, alongside the line a short distance east of Aigle has over 26,500 sq.m. of space available for workshops and nowadays is the main depot for the three TPC narrow gauge lines in Aigle. Space is also available on the site for expansion in the future should this be required.
 
In 2006 the TPC commenced a programme of building works at Aigle in collaboration with the CFF/SBB/FFS. This was to bring together all three of the metre gauge lines at new platforms adjacent to those of the main line company. Work was completed in early 2007 when the services were brought together; the AOCM making use of the two platforms nearest the main line. These platforms feature new lighting and public address systems and have easy access from the town's Place de la Gare.

Rolling stock 

(a) Builders plate shows 1986, delivery was in 1987
(b) Not in service at present.

Gallery

Abbreviations 
ACMV    Ateliers de constructions mécaniques de Vevey
BBC     Brown, Boveri & Cie
BTB Birstigtalbahn (Baselland Transport)
BT      Bombardier Transportation (Vevey)
SLM     Swiss Locomotive and Machine Works, Winterthur.

References

Rack railways in Switzerland
Railway lines in Switzerland
Transports Publics du Chablais lines
Metre gauge railways in Switzerland
Mountain railways
1500 V DC railway electrification